Acacia ashbyae, commonly known as Ashby's wattle, is a species of wattle that is endemic to Western Australia.

Description

Taxonomy
The species was first formally described by the botanist Bruce Maslin in 1974 as part of the work Studies in the genus Acacia - 2 - Miscellaneous new phyllodinous species published in the journal Nuytsia. It was reclassified in 2003 by Leslie Pedley as Racosperma ashbyae then transferred back to the genus Acacia in 2006.

The specific epithet ashbyae honours botanical illustrator and plant collector Alison Ashby.

Distribution and habitat
It occurs on sandy and loamy soils along roadsides, on rocky rises and sandplains in the Avon Wheatbelt, Geraldton Sandplains and Yalgoo IBRA bioregions.

See also
 List of Acacia species

References

ashbyae
Acacias of Western Australia
Fabales of Australia
Plants described in 1974
Taxa named by Bruce Maslin